Green bee-eater has been split into the following species:
 Asian green bee-eater, 	Merops orientalis
 African green bee-eater, Merops viridissimus
 Arabian green bee-eater, Merops cyanophrys

Birds by common name